Josiah Bracken Alexander (12 December 1826 – 1882) was an English first-class cricketer.

Alexander made a single appearance in first-class cricket for the Gentlemen of Kent against the Gentlemen of England in 1853 at the St Lawrence Ground, Canterbury. In a match which the Gentlemen of England won by 7 wickets, Alexander batted twice, ending the Gentlemen of Kent first-innings not out on 2, while in their second-innings he opened the batting and was dismissed for a single run by Edward Drake.

He died at Barton-upon-Irwell, Lancashire sometime in 1882.

References

External links

1826 births
1882 deaths
English cricketers
Gentlemen of Kent cricketers